The Hungary national rugby league team, known as the Magyar Bulls, represents Hungary in the sport of rugby league football. Making their debut against the Czech Republic in July 2011, they played their first ranked international against Greece in October 2013.

History and setting up

Magyar Bulls RLFC, Hungary's National Rugby league team was founded in Budapest in May 2011 by members of the Budapest Exiles RFC, keen to try rugby league and with an open invitation to other teams in Hungary to send players - all with the objective of honouring an invitation to play in the CEE European Bowl competition vs. the Czech Republic.

From small beginnings on a Monday evening, on Margit Island, in the middle of the Danube, the squad has grown to be able to select a nucleus of 20 players to play against the Czech Republic on 23 July. The pull of playing international RL has seen enquiries to train and play from a number of other clubs in Hungary as well as players of Hungarian origin who have travelled back to play from Italy and the UK.

In June 2013, Hungary was granted Observer status by the RLEF. They subsequently played their first fully sanctioned international against a Greece team featuring professional players Michael Korkidas and Braith Anasta.
 
In 2014, Tour in Paris again and Hungary competed in the inaugural Balkans Cup tournament in Serbia. This was Hungary's first International tournament. Hungary finished the overall tournament in fourth place. They also made history in the tournament, as they recorded their first ever international try in their match with Bosnia.
In 2015 Tour in Belgrade on Euro 9' Tournament.

Current squad
Squad selected for the 2018 Emerging Nations World Championship;
Karoly Acsai
Benjamin Bronzon
Mark Czifra
Andras Eglesz
Aaron Farkas
David Farkas
Jared Farkas
Nathan Farkas
Stuart Flanagan
Jayson Gerecs
Lenard Grimm
Istvan Krupp
Zsolt Lukacs
Paul McKewin
Gergely Nagy
Gyula Nikoletti
Josh Institoris
Daniel Ivan
Paul Ivan
Simon Kalafusz
James Kovac
Stephen Kovacs
Paul Mozar
Billy Mozer
Lachlyn Mulford
Joel Saaghy
Shane Stevens
Joseph Toth
Cruize Turay
Josh Warner
Dane Weatherill
Brent Varga

Hungarian National Rugby League in Australia 

In 2016, Hungary began searching for players in Australia of Hungarian heritage to play for Hungary. This was met with resounding response, with many quality players putting their name down. Several training sessions were held in Sydney by coach John Wilson and manager Stephen Németh.

On Saturday the 4 February 2017, Hungary played their first test match outside of Europe against Uruguay who were making their International debut, in front of 500 spectators. Hungary ran away with the game 50-4 in a dominant display. The team consisted of only Australian players with Hungarian heritage. This was also Hungary's first test match victory across any continent. The four Farkas brothers were outstanding, scoring 30 of the 50 points between themselves alone, with Aaron Farkas accumulating 16 himself in a spectacular performance at hooker. Alexander Fricska scored a try on debut.

On Wednesday the 8 February 2017, just 4 days after the first test played outside of the Europe, Hungary played their second against a stronger Thailand side, featuring ex NRL and Super league coach Brian Smith, in front of 100 spectators. Hungary opened up the scoring with 2 quick tries, before scoring 2 more before the half. Thailand came out strong in the second half scoring first points, however Hungary were too strong and ran out 44-10 winners becoming just their second test match victory since the teams origin 6 years prior. The game was almost called off as the night before, a storm washed out the majority of Sydney's Rugby League fields. Just hours before kickoff, the game was rescheduled at Endeavour Sports High School, instead of the original venue, Erskineville Oval.

Results
A † denotes that the match did not contribute to the RLIF World Rankings.

Overall record

Cap Number and playing record
As of 8 February 2017.

See also
 Rugby league in Hungary
 Hungarian Rugby League Federation

References

External links 
 
 Magyar Bulls RLFC blog page 
 Magyar Bulls RLFC YouTube channel 
 RLEF (Rugby League Europe Federation News site - Squad announcement 
 RLEF (Rugby League Europe Federation News site - Official match report for the first game 
RLEF (Rugby League Europe Federation)
"An appetite for Rugby League?" - Forty-Twenty Magazine - article dated 30 June (pages 38–39)- Adam Nunn and Phil Caplan
"Reality Czech" - Rugby League World magazine - article dated August 2011 (pages 65–67) - Tom Coates

 
National rugby league teams